The R583 road is a regional road in Ireland in County Cork. It runs southwest to northeast from Millstreet to the N72 national secondary road between Mallow and Killarney. The road is 9km long.

See also
Roads in Ireland
National primary road
National secondary road

References
Roads Act 1993 (Classification of Regional Roads) Order 2006 – Department of Transport

Regional roads in the Republic of Ireland
Roads in County Cork